is a set of novels based loosely on Chinese mythology.

It was written by Yoshiki Tanaka in collaboration with Japanese illustrator Yoshitaka Amano (Kodansha Novels edition) and manga artist group Clamp (Kodansha bunkobon). It is written with a humorous and satirical tone. It published the 14th volume as of 2019.

On July 24, 2008, at San Diego Comic-Con, North American publisher Del Rey announced that they have secured the license to the Sohryuden novel series. This would have been the first work by Yoshiki Tanaka to be released in English. This was projected to be released in 2009, but was seen on online bookstores as having a 2011 release date. Due to the closure of Del Rey, the release has been cancelled.

Story
The story features four divine Dragon Kings, rulers of the four parts of the world according to Chinese myths. The brothers are reborn in the modern world, complete with supernatural powers and the ability to become the Dragons which are their true forms. They are content to live ordinary lives as long as nobody meddles with them.

It becomes the mission of the four brothers to defeat the "Four Sisters", organization headed by four tycoons from America connected with the "Bulls" - enemies of the Dragons who have received ownership of the Western half of the world while the Dragons keep rule over the Eastern half of the world - before they use their control over technology and the economy to take over the world. However, as this battle begins, the four brothers must also find their place in the world as they flee from the destructive will of the "Bulls".

Anime
The contents to the 1st through the 6th volumes of an original novel serve as a base for the animation.

Sohryuden has been released as a 12 episode animated series. Each episode is about 45 minutes. In the U.S., Central Park Media has released all of the series on both VHS and DVD. The new releases came out November 22, 2005.

The anime was also released in the UK and Australia under the title of The Legend of the Four Kings by Manga Entertainment across six videos. The series was only released on VHS and is now long out of print.

Manga
The Clamp version was serialized as Mystery DX of Kadokawa Shoten in 1994.

Intended to be a comedy, Owaru, one of the Dragon Kings, goes to Osaka to wakes snakes up. There are only three stories, and the story has not been concluded. As research, Clamp went to Osaka.

The manga version by Clamp is quite rare and had been previously very difficult to obtain. Because of high demand from fans, the chapters have been compiled into tankōbon format under the title Sohryuden Genga-shu in 2004. Additionally, there is a manga short (only 4 pages) drawn for the Sohryuden drama CD, which had been included in Sohryuden Genga-shu.

In 2004-2005, manga artist  serialized another manga version of Sohryuden as a comedy starring Owaru. Serialized in Magazine Special of Kodansha, it is Koji's debut work and has received positive reception and reviews.

Characters
 (Blue Dragon of the East)

At 23, Hajime is the oldest of the four brothers and since the death of his parents and his grandfather, he is the guardian of the family. Extremely intelligent, Hajime taught History at Kyowa College but lost his directorship because of his uncle, Seichiro Toba. Generally, Hajime is very compassionate and will only lose his temper when he needs to - mainly when his family is threatened. Hajime is the strongest of the brothers and his fighting skills are exemplary. He has a close bond with all his brothers - enjoying the company of Tsuzuku, acting as a mentor to Owaru and being very protective of Amaru. Hajime is the Blue Dragon King of the East and controls the force of gravity in his dragon form.

 (Red Dragon of the South)

The second brother at 19 years old. Tsuzuku is often seen as the pretty boy of the four brothers as he always attracts female attention especially when he is at college. That said, he tends to be very humble about this. Well mannered, polite, and insightful, Tsuzuku keeps his attacks to irony and sarcasm and will only fight when absolutely necessary and has an impressive array of attacks at his disposal when unleashed. He also comes up with plans to help his brothers out of tight situations. He is very close to Hajime and often shares advice with him on numerous topics. He often enjoys banter with Owaru and is also protective of Amaru. He is the Red Dragon King of the South and, in his dragon form, controls fire (electro-magnetic and nuclear energy).

 (White Dragon of the West)

The third brother at 15 years old. Owaru is the most energetic out of the brothers. He has a huge appetite and, in contrast to Tsuzuku, can never shy away from a good fight. Despite his rather confident and brash exterior as well as showing a disdain for college work, Owaru is a gifted student at Kyowa College. He sometimes displays signs of carelessness that often earns a lecture mainly from Hajime. He is the one most likely to engage in combat out of all the brothers and his athleticism and superb fighting skills always ensure that he comes out on top. Owaru often sees Hajime as a sort of father figure, given that he is the one he called for when he was in danger. He indulges in banter with Tsuzuku while he acts as a guardian to Amaru, more so then his brothers. He is the White Dragon King of the West which governs the air (wind and sound, as vibration of air).

 (Black Dragon of the North)

At 13, Amaru is the youngest of the four brothers and appears to be the most vulnerable - in reality has astonishing powers. These powers aid the four brothers, especially when they are in human form. He is very gentle and caring and sometimes displays maturity beyond his years - more so than Owaru. That said, he looks up to Owaru as he always seems to get involved with everything Owaru does. His relationships with Tsuzuku and Hajime is usually based on him looking to them for guidance. Amaru rarely displays fighting tendencies but as the episodes go on, he shows us more of his skills. Amaru is prone to having dragon dreams from time to time and often has them prophesied by Hajime. Because of his youth he is more in touch with his dragon powers as he can't control it as well as his brothers. He is the Black Dragon King of the North which controls the water (and lightning).

Matsuri is 18 years old and the cousin of the Ryudo family. She is greatly adored by all the Ryudos and she often adds a female touch to their household, cooking their meals and cleaning up their mess. She seems to have an extreme soft spot for Hajime, often hinting at a relationship between the two, though the two never step over the boundaries of morality. She enjoys the company of Tsuzuku and acts as a mother figure to both Owaru and Amaru. In return, all the Ryudos are very protective of her. Her father is Seichiro Toba, the self-centered and greedy head of education at Kyowa college and Matsuri is extremely contemptuous of him.

Seichiro is the father of Matsuri Toba, the uncle of the four Ryudo brothers, and the headmaster of the Kyowa Institute founded by Tsukasa Ryudo. Seichiro is driven by financial gain and wants to become head of all education in Tokyo and will stoop to any level to achieve it, even deceiving his own family. Matsuri is extremely embarrassed and contemptuous of him while, not surprisingly, he is disliked greatly by all of the Ryudo brothers despite being their uncle.

Saeko is Matsuri's mother and the long-suffering wife of Seichiro. She is the daughter of Tsukasa Ryudo, the Ryudo brothers' grandfather, making her the aunt of the Ryudo brothers. It is implied that Seichiro may have married her so that he could become the headmaster of Kyowa College. The Ryudo brothers are very fond of her and show her far more respect than their uncle.

Known as "", Funazu is an elderly man in his 90s with huge influence in the political world and the first major foe of the Ryudo brothers. He had known their grandfather for a long time and he became aware of his dragon powers. They both ventured to the Dragon Village known as Ryosenkyu (Dragon Springs) and while there, Funazu killed and drank the blood of a woman who resided there. He noticed a change in his system where he was immune to many weapons such as knives and bullets so he extracted the rest of the blood and had it injected into him over a period of time, expanding his lifespan. His presence in Japan meant that he was able to keep the Four Sisters corporation from influencing the Japanese government. He battles the brothers, where the Japanese army provoke the Dragon Kings.

/

Lady L is a secret agent of the Four Sisters corporation and a representative of the Mulligan Foundation, which is part of it. The Four Sisters corporation are an organization, which influences how governments in all nations are run. They tried to take over the Japanese government in the past but they were prevented by Gozen of Kamakura. She is American by birth but has Japanese blood in her, which she greatly detests. Her Chinese grandmother was raped by a Japanese soldier and her mother was born but they both were not accepted by Japanese society as they were of mixed heritage and were shipped out to America where her mother met an American man. As a result, Lady L decided to try and use the Ryudo brothers' dragon abilities to destroy Japan as the dragon represented 'good' in Japan. She is responsible for the transformations of Hajime, Tsuzuku and Owaru into their dragon forms.

The 54-year-old MP of the Conservative Party who dies in a car accident.

A 53-year-old secretary of the government.

Hatushi Tamozawa
A sadistic surgeon who specializes in live dissection. He was Gozen of Kamakura's personal physician and would keep samples of his blood, believing it to be linked with the blood of the Ryudo brothers. He was a surgeon during the last war for the Canton Army and dissected over 80 prisoners. He was also responsible for Tsukasa Ryudo, the brother's grandfather, becoming ill for the rest of his life after catching Typhus Bacteria from a cloth that Tamaozawa gave to Gozen. He often clashes with Lady L, as she tries to assert the Four Sisters' influence over Japan, clashing with his desire for a scientific breakthrough regarding the Ryudos.

Episodes
Sohryuden was animated in 12 episodes. The titles displayed are the U.K. version while the Japanese version titles are in brackets.

Chapter 1 - Dragon Prophecy (The Four Brothers Under Fire) : Day-to-day life for Hajime Ryudo and his brothers is suddenly disrupted by kidnappings, assault and expulsion threats. As the eldest, Hajime realises that the prophecy of the Dragon King will soon become reality.

Chapter 2 - Ancient Truths (The Legend of Dragon Springs) : Hajime comes face to face with the oppressive tyrant, Gozen of Kamakura, and learns of the ancient legend of the four kings. Offered a chance of complete supremacy over the city of Tokyo, Hajime must take a tough decision - one that could alter the brothers' whole existence.

Chapter 3 - The Awakening (The Black Dragon King Revealed) : The Ryudo brothers, accused of murder, flee the city and fall straight into Gozen's trap. The Army, together with Gozen, launch a mass attack on the unsuspecting brothers to stimulate their transformation into dragons and use their powers to fuel Gozen's strength.

Chapter 4 - The Masked Enemy (Tokyo Bay Rhapsody) : More than just fun and games are in store when the Ryudo brothers take a day trip to Tokyo Fairyland. They soon discover that they are wanted by Military Intelligence for their hidden powers and true ghost train horrors come to life when they are pursued through the fairground.

Chapter 5 - Programmed To Kill (The Graceful Agent) : Dr Hatushi Tamozawa, Gozen of Kamakura's personal physician, thrives on dissecting human beings. Aware of the Ryudo brothers supernatural powers, he is obsessed with experimenting on them and sets out to capture them with his cybernetic hunting dogs. When the two youngest brothers, Owaru and Amaru, suspiciously win VIP tickets to the big league game, the evil doctor lures them into his cunning trap.

Chapter 6 - Dragon Alliance (Skyscrapers and the Red Dragon) : The beautiful mysterious megalomanic Lady L, an extremely influential figure in Japan, will do anything to achieve world domination. Recognising the powers of the Ryudo brothers, she targets Tsuzuku, desperate to reach his inner soul and use his power to achieve her goal. Her proposition angers him and when the situation escalates, drives him to do exactly what frightens him most...

Chapter 7 - Kill the Dragon (Revenge of the Four Brothers) : The media world is fascinated by the phenomenon of the Red Dragon which has attacked the cityscape. Unknown to them, the enraged monster is the transformed Tsuzuku Ryudo. The evil Dr Tamozawa is one of the few to have discovered the Ryudo's secret and, using his new generation cyborgs, he engages in a plan to kidnap Owaru for his scientific experiments...

Chapter 8 - The Iron Dragon (Rampage of the Iron Dragon) : Owaru Ryudo is still captive at the lab awaiting dissection at the hands of the evil, butchering, Dr Tamozawa. The remaining brothers, relentless in their search for him, are being pursued by government agencies. Forced to flee, they steal a military tank in collaboration with a rebellious army captain eager for a slice of the action. The chase is on and time is running out for Owaru and his brothers to salvage the city of Tokyo...

Chapter 9 - The Fierce Wind (Storm of the White Dragon King) : The ruthless Lady L has kidnapped Owaru and has held him captive in an electrified cage at the Yokota Air Base, ready to be transported to America. Hajime sets off on a lone rescue mission to try and free his brother but the attempt causes a disastrous airplane explosion on the runway. The trauma awakens the White Dragon of the Western Isles within Owaru and he begins to destroy the airbase and the town near it. Realising the awesome power of the beast may injure the innocent, there is only one way Hajime can control its power...but even that might be too frightening to conceive...

Chapter 10 - Narrow Escape (The Brothers' Greatest Escape) : Lady L has more evil plans in store for the Ryudo brothers when she organises their arrest by the police. A replica of Hajime attempts to release the prisoners and in the process destroys the police station, having the Ryudo brothers branded as terrorists. The entire law enforcement agencies of the city are placed on emergency alert and are part of the biggest manhunt ever known. The Ryudo brothers are the innocent victims...the hunt is on!

Chapter 11 - The Blue Dragon Soars to Heaven (The Soaring Blue Dragon King) : Hajime has become a captive of Lady L and is brought aboard the aircraft carrier, Dynasty. But waiting for him on board is the dissecting maniac, Dr Tamozawa. Tamozawa's cruel treatment summons the wrath of Hajime, and the fourth dragon finally emerges. The Blue Dragon King can control the force of gravity and it plucks the Dynasty and her fleet up into the stratosphere. Tsuzuku and the others, who have rejoined their three brave friends: Shinkai, Mizuchi and Nijikawa, escape Japan in a defense transport plane. But now they must find the Blue Dragon King!

Chapter 12 - Four Dragons In the Heaven (The Four Dragon Kings Take To the Sky) : The defense transport plane that Tsuzuku and the others have stolen is in danger of crashing! Desperate to save Matsuri and their friends, Tsuzuku and his two brothers transform themselves into all powerful dragons. Meanwhile, the Blue Dragon King has travelled to America and begins to destroy all the military bases and facilities and finally targets his anger towards the US President. The other three dragons manage to reunite with Hajime but can their combined power overcome the spirit known as the Shiyu, an ancient enemy of the dragon race over 3,000 years ago? The world is on the brink of Armageddon as it enters the ultimate battle....

References

External links

1987 fantasy novels
1987 Japanese novels
1991 anime OVAs
1994 manga
2004 manga
Action anime and manga
Adventure anime and manga
Central Park Media
Chinese mythology in anime and manga
Works by Clamp (manga artists)
Dragons in popular culture
Fantasy anime and manga
Kadokawa Shoten manga
Kodansha manga
Novels by Yoshiki Tanaka
Sharp Point Press titles